Marie-Ève Lacasse (born May 24, 1982 in Hull, Quebec) is a Canadian writer. She is most noted for her 2020 novel Autobiographie de l'étranger, which was a shortlisted finalist for the Governor General's Award for French-language fiction at the 2020 Governor General's Awards.

References

1982 births
Living people
Canadian women novelists
Canadian novelists in French
French Quebecers
Writers from Gatineau
21st-century Canadian novelists
21st-century Canadian women writers